Jeong Kwang-Sik (born July 12, 1985) is a South Korean footballer (forward).

In 2016 he played for Madura United.

References

External links

 

1985 births
Expatriate footballers in Japan
Expatriate footballers in Indonesia
K League 1 players
Liga 1 (Indonesia) players
Living people
Association football midfielders
South Korean expatriate footballers
South Korean expatriate sportspeople in Indonesia
South Korean footballers
Persija Jakarta players